Bobby or Bob Hill may refer to:
 Bob Hill (footballer) (1867–1938), Scottish footballer
 Bob Hill (American football) (1892–1942), American football player
 Bobby Hill (motorcyclist) (1922–2022), American motorcycle racer
 Bobby Hill (Scottish footballer) (born 1938), Scottish footballer
 Bobby Hill (Australian footballer) (born 2000), Australian rules footballer
 Bobby Hill (cricketer), Scottish cricketer and administrator
 Bob Hill (politician) (born 1940), Jersey politician and human rights campaigner
 Bobby Joe Hill (1943–2002), American basketball player 
 Bob Hill (born 1948), American basketball coach
 Bobby Hill (baseball) (born 1978), American professional baseball player
 Bob Hill (racing driver), American race car driver, see List of ARCA drivers
 Bobby Hill (King of the Hill), fictional character in the cartoon series King of the Hill
 Bobby Hill, fictional police officer on the television series Hill Street Blues

See also 
 Robert Hill (disambiguation)
 Hill (surname)